Globočnik is a Slovenian language surname. It may refer to:

Odilo Globočnik (1904–1945),  Austrian Nazi and later an SS leader
Gustav Globočnik Edler von Vojka (1859–1946),  Austrian soldier and nobleman
Tomaž Globočnik, Slovenian biathlete

Slovene-language surnames